The Marriage of Heaven and Hell Part I is the sixth studio album by American power metal band Virgin Steele, released in 1994. It is the first part of a trilogy of concept albums, comprising also The Marriage of Heaven and Hell Part II and Invictus, about the relationship between humanity and divinity. The songs of the album do not follow a storyline, but they were inspired by religion, mythology, poetry and the personal beliefs of lyricist DeFeis.

De Feis and Pursino played all the bass lines on the album, after bass player Rob DeMartino had left the band.

Track listing 
All lyrics by David DeFeis, music as listed

Personnel

Band members 
 David DeFeis - vocals, keyboards, producer
 Ed Pursino - all guitars, bass
 Joey Ayvazian - drums

Production 
 Steve Young - engineer, mixing
 Axel Thubeauville - executive producer

References 

1995 albums
Virgin Steele albums
Noise Records albums